Paisley Park Records was an American record label founded by musician Prince in 1985, which was distributed by and funded in part by Warner Bros. Records. It was started in 1985, following the success of the film and album Purple Rain. The label shares its name with Prince's recording complex Paisley Park Studios and the song "Paisley Park" on his 1985 Around the World in a Day album. Paisley Park was opened to the public as a museum and memorial to Prince following his death. October 28, 2016, is officially known as Paisley Park Day in the city of Chanhassen to recognize the opening of the museum.

History
While Prince had great chart success in the 1980s, the success generally did not transfer to other acts.  With the exception of Sheila E.'s 1985 album Romance 1600 (the label's debut non-Prince release), Tevin Campbell's single "Round and Round" and the Time's 1990 release Pandemonium, the label had very few commercial successes by artists other than Prince.

In 1994, amid Prince's feud with Warner Bros., Warner ended its distribution deal with Paisley Park, effectively closing the label. Prince fought for the rights to the master recordings of all artists recorded there. Prince later started NPG Records, run by Trevor Guy.
The vice-president of Operations for the label until 1991 was Alan Leeds. (Leeds won a Grammy for writing the liner notes for a James Brown album, and at one point served as Prince's tour manager on several tours.) Following Leeds' departure, radio promotion executive Graham Armstrong took over the role until 1991, when Gilbert Davison and Jill Willis, co-managers of Prince and president and executive vice-president of Paisley Park Enterprises, negotiated a joint venture between PPE and Warner Bros. (with the help of Prince attorney Gary Stiffelman). With the joint venture came funding for additional staff to run the label and oversee its artists – including Mavis Staples, George Clinton, Ingrid Chavez and Carmen Electra. Staffers included John Dukakis and Kerry Gordy as co-presidents of the label.

The label's office were in a building with the address 1999 Avenue of the Stars.

Paisley Park Studios

The studio was designed by architecture firm BOTO Design Inc, of Santa Monica, California, and officially opened on September 11, 1987. It contains two live music venues used as rehearsal spaces. After the label folded in 1994, Prince continued to live and record at Paisley Park Studios. Prince's intention before his death was to establish Paisley Park as a public venue like Graceland. He was found dead in his estate's elevator on April 21, 2016.

Norwegian band A-ha recorded much of their 1993 album Memorial Beach at Paisley.

Touring Paisley Park
After Prince's death, Paisley Park, a 65,000-square-foot complex, was turned into a museum open to the public. Tours of the Paisley Park Museum started October 2016. Graceland Holdings, the company that has managed Elvis Presley's Graceland since 1982, organizes the tours. Tours include the studios where Prince recorded, produced, and mixed some of his biggest hits, and the soundstage where he rehearsed for tours and hosted exclusive private concerts. Also featured are thousands of artifacts from his personal archives, including iconic concert wardrobe, awards, musical instruments, artwork, rare music and video recordings, concert memorabilia, automobiles and motorcycles. In 2017, regular tours and punctual shows are organized in Paisley Park.

Carver County officials confirmed a story that Prince's ashes are now 'on show' in the main entrance to Paisley Park in an urn in the shape of Paisley Park. In the basement of Paisley Park there was a vault of unreleased material, hundreds of hours of live recordings, experiments and top-secret songs.
The urn has since been removed from the atrium on which it was first displayed and placed in the vault. The contents of the vault have been since removed and relocated to a studio in Los Angeles to be restored, remastered, and stored in climate-controlled storage to be used for later release.

Discography

Prince albums
1985: Prince and The Revolution: Around the World in a Day
1986: Prince and The Revolution: Parade
1987: Prince: Sign O' the Times
1988: Prince: Lovesexy
1990: Prince: Graffiti Bridge
1991: Prince and the New Power Generation: Diamonds and Pearls
1992: Prince and the New Power Generation: Love Symbol Album
1993: Prince: The Hits/The B-Sides

Paisley Park albums
1985: The Family: The Family
1985: Sheila E.: Romance 1600
1986: Mazarati: Mazarati
1987: Madhouse: 8
1987: Sheila E.: Sheila E.
1987: Jill Jones: Jill Jones
1987: Taja Sevelle: Taja Sevelle §
1987: Madhouse: 16 §
1988: Dale Bozzio: Riot in English
1988: The Three O'Clock: Vermillion §
1988: Good Question: Good Question
1989: Tony LeMans: Tony LeMans §
1989: George Clinton: The Cinderella Theory
1989: Kahoru Kohiruimaki: Time the Motion (Japanese release only)
1989: Mavis Staples: Time Waits for No One
1990: Kahoru Kohiruimaki: Time the Motion Live (Japanese release only)
1990: The Time: Pandemonium §
1991: Eric Leeds: Times Squared
1991: T.C. Ellis: True Confessions
1991: Ingrid Chavez: May 19, 1992
1993: Carmen Electra: Carmen Electra
1993: Mavis Staples: The Voice
1993: George Clinton: Hey, Man, Smell My Finger
1993: Eric Leeds: Things Left Unsaid

Note: All titles were distributed by Warner Bros. Records, except for those denoted with §, which were distributed by sister label Reprise Records.

See also
List of record labels
List of music museums

References

External links 

 The Inside Story on Designing Prince's Paisley Park: Exclusive

 
Prince (musician)
Defunct record labels of the United States
Chanhassen, Minnesota
Pop record labels
Vanity record labels
Warner Records
Record labels established in 1985
Record labels disestablished in 1994
1985 establishments in Minnesota
1994 disestablishments in Minnesota
Defunct companies based in Minnesota